Wadsworth High School is a public high school for grades 9 through 12 in Wadsworth, Ohio, United States.  It is the only high school in the Wadsworth City School District.  The school colors are officially red and white.  The school mascot is the grizzly bear, and the sports teams are nicknamed the Grizzlies. The current building opened in 2012 and the student body population is approximately 1,700 students.

Athletics state championships

 Boys Wrestling – 1942, 2010
 Girls Cross Country – 1979, 1980
 Girls Basketball – 1997, 2016

Notable alumni
Savannah Brown: poet and author
Scott Fletcher: professional baseball player in Major League Baseball (MLB) 
Michael Foreman: American astronaut
Andy Sonnanstine: professional baseball player in MLB 
Brad Warner: Buddhism author

References

External links
 

High schools in Medina County, Ohio
Public high schools in Ohio
Wadsworth, Ohio